The Grand Prix Adrie van der Poel is a cyclo-cross race held in Hoogerheide, Netherlands, which is part of the UCI Cyclo-cross World Cup. The race is named after former cyclo-cross world champion Adrie van der Poel, who won the event himself once.

Past winners

References
 Men's results
 Women's results

UCI Cyclo-cross World Cup
Cyclo-cross races
Cycle races in the Netherlands
Recurring sporting events established in 1988
1988 establishments in the Netherlands
Cycling in North Brabant
Sport in Woensdrecht